The Brahma Sūtras are a Sanskrit text, attributed to the sages Bādarāyaṇa and Vyāsa, estimated to have been completed in its surviving form in approx. 400–450 CE, while the original version might be ancient and composed between 600 BCE and 200 BCE. The text systematizes and summarizes the philosophical and spiritual ideas in the Upanishads. The scholar Adi Shankara's interpretation of the Brahmasutra attempted to synthesize diverse and sometimes apparently conflicting teachings of the Upanishads by arguing, as John Koller states: "that Brahman and Atman are, in some respects, different, but, at the deepest level, non-different (advaita), being identical." This view of Vedanta, however, was not universal in Indic thought, and other commentators later held differing views. It is one of the foundational texts of the Vedānta school of Hindu philosophy.

The Brahma Sūtras consist of 555 aphoristic verses (sutras) in four chapters. These verses are primarily about the nature of human existence and universe, and ideas about the metaphysical principle of Ultimate Reality called Brahman. The first chapter discusses the metaphysics of Absolute Reality, the second chapter reviews and addresses the objections raised by the ideas of competing orthodox schools of Hindu philosophies such as Nyaya, Yoga, Vaisheshika and Mimamsa as well as heterodox schools such as Buddhism and Jainism, the third chapter discusses epistemology and path to gaining spiritually liberating knowledge, and the last chapter states why such a knowledge is an important human need.

The Brahma Sūtras is one of three most important texts in Vedanta along with the Principal Upanishads and the Bhagavad Gita. It has been influential to various schools of Indian philosophies, but interpreted differently by the non-dualistic Advaita Vedanta sub-school, the theistic Vishishtadvaita and Dvaita Vedanta sub-schools, as well as others. Several commentaries on the Brahma Sūtras are lost to history or yet to be found; of the surviving ones, the most well studied commentaries on the Brahma Sūtras include the bhashya by Adi Shankara, Ramanuja, Madhvacharya, Bhaskara and many others.

They are also known as the Vedanta Sutra (Sanskrit: वेदान्त सूत्र), deriving this name from Vedanta which literally means the "final aim of the Vedas". Other names for Brahma Sūtras is Shariraka Sutra, wherein Shariraka means "that which lives in the body (Sharira), or the Self, Soul", and Bhikshu-sutra, which literally means "Sutras for monks or mendicants".

Author and chronology
The Brahma Sūtras or Brahmasutra are attributed to Badarayana. In some texts, Badarayana is also called Vyasa, which literally means "one who arranges".

Badarayana was the Guru (teacher) of Jaimini, the latter credited with authoring Mimamsa Sutras of the Mimamsa school of Hindu philosophy. This is likely, given that both Badarayana and Jaimini quote each other as they analyze each other's theories, Badarayana emphasizing knowledge while Jaimini emphasizes rituals, sometimes agreeing with each other, sometimes disagreeing, often anti-thesis of the other.

The Brahma Sūtras text is dated to centuries that followed Buddha and Mahavira, because it mentions and critiques the ideas of Buddhism and Jainism in Chapter 2. The text's relative chronology is also based on the fact that Badarayana quotes all major known orthodox Hindu schools of philosophy except Nyaya. The exact century of its composition or completion in final form is unknown, but scholars such as Lochtefeld suggest that the text was complete sometime between 500 and 200 BCE, while Sarvepalli Radhakrishnan and Dasgupta independently suggest the 2nd century BCE as more likely. Paul Deussen places it between 200 BCE and 400 CE.

Hermann Jacobi in early 20th century suggested that Madhyamaka Buddhist concepts such as Sunyavada, acknowledged in the Brahma Sūtras, may be a late invention, and suggests that both Sunyavada and Brahma Sūtras may therefore have emerged between 200 and 450 CE. Daniel Ingalls disagreed with Jacobi chronology in his 1954 paper, critiquing Jacobi's assumptions and interpretation of sutras 2.2.28-32 in dating the entire document, and stating that "the Brahma Sūtras could not have been composed later than the start of the common era". According to Hajime Nakamura, the Brahma Sūtraswere likely complete in the current form between 400 and 450 CE. The existence of earlier versions of the Brahma Sūtras, and multiple authors predating Badarayana, is supported by textual evidence.

Some scholars, such as Sengaku Mayeda, state Brahma Sūtra that have survived into the modern times may be the work of multiple authors but those who lived after Badarayana, and that these authors composed the currently surviving Brahma Sūtras starting about 300 BCE through about 400-450 CE. Nakamura states that the original version of Brahma Sūtras is likely very ancient and its inception coincides with the Kalpa Sutras period (1st-millennium BCE).

Natalia Isaeva states, "on the whole, scholars are rather unanimous, considering the most probable date for Brahma Sūtras sometime between the 2nd-century BCE and the 2nd-century CE.

Assigning a later date because of mention of concepts of Buddhism etc., is rejected by Madhvacharya in his work, Anuvyakhyana. He explains the mention of different philosophies and their criticism in the Brahma Sutra as refutations of general ideas, which are eternal. And not specific schools of thought like Buddhism etc. So, there is no necessary to assign a later date.

Structure
The Brahma Sūtras consist of 555 aphorisms or sūtras, in four chapters (adhyāya), with each chapter divided into four parts (pāda). Each part is further subdivided into sections called Adhikaraņas with sutras. Some scholars, such as Francis Clooney, call the Adhikaraņas as "case studies" with a defined hermeneutic process.

Each Adhikaraņa of Brahma Sūtras has varying numbers of sutras, and most sections of the text are structured to address the following:
 Vishaya (विषय): subject, issue or topic
 Vismaya (विस्मय): doubt, uncertainty or perplexity
 Purva-paksha (पूर्वपक्ष): prima facie view, or prior part and arguments
 Siddhanta (सिद्धान्त): theory and arguments presented, proposed doctrine, or conclusions
 Sangati (सङ्गति): connection between sections, synthesis, or coming together of knowledge

The Brahma Sūtras text has 189 Adhikaranas. Each section (case study) in the text opens with the Mukhya (chief, main) sutra that states the purpose of that section, and the various sections of the Brahma Sūtras include Vishaya-Vakyas (cite the text sources and evidence they use).

Sutras were meant to assist the memory of the student who had gone through long discussions with his guru, as memory aids or clues and maximum thoughts were compressed in a few words which were unambiguous, giving the essence of the arguments on the topic. The Sutras of the text, states Adi Shankara in his commentary, are structured like a string that ties together the Vedanta texts like a garland of flowers.

Contents
Sengaku Mayeda states that the Brahma Sūtras distills and consolidates the extensive teachings found in a variety of Upanishads of Hinduism, summarizing, arranging, unifying and systematizing the Upanishadic theories, possibly "written from a Bhedābheda Vedāntic viewpoint." Prior to the creation of the Brahmasutras, the Vedic literature had grown into an enormous collection of ideas and practices, ranging from practical rituals (karma-kanda) to abstract philosophy (jnana-kanda). Different and conflicting theories on metaphysical problems, diverse mutually contradicting unsystematized teachings on rituals and philosophies multiplied in the four Vedas, creating the need for consolidated and systematized content summary of the Sruti. This was achieved by Jaimini's Mimamsa-sutra which focused on externalized rituals as the spiritual path, while Badarayana's Brahma Sūtras focused on internalized philosophy as the spiritual path.

The text reviews and critiques most major orthodox schools of Hindu philosophy as well as all heterodox Indian philosophies such as Buddhism, with the exception of Samkhya and Yoga philosophies which it holds in high regards and recurrently refers to them in all its four chapters, adding in sutras 2.1.3 and 4.2.21 that Yoga and Samkhya are similar. The text cites and quotes from the ten Principal Upanishads often, the Kaushitaki Upanishad and the Shvetashvatara Upanishad in several sutras, but also mentions Upanishads now unknown and lost. The contents of the text also acknowledge and analyze the various Vedic schools, and mentions the existence of multiple, diverging versions of the same underlying text.

The sutras of the Brahma Sūtras are aphorisms, which Paul Deussen states to be "threads stretched out in weaving to form the basis of the web", and intelligible "when the woof is added" with a commentary.

Chapter 1: What is Brahman?
The first chapter is regarded in Vedanta tradition as Samanvaya (Harmony), because it distills, synchronizes and brings into a harmonious whole the seemingly diverse and conflicting passages in various Sruti texts. It consists of 134 sutras, with eleven Adhikaranas in the first Pada, seven Adhikaranas in second, fourteen Adhikaranas in third, and eight in the fourth Pada. The different sub-schools of Vedanta have interpreted the sutras in the last Pada differently, and some count only seven Adhikaranas in the fourth Pada.

This Brahma Sūtras chapter asserts that all the Upanishads primarily aim and coherently describe the knowledge and meditation of Brahman, the ultimate reality. Brahman is the source from which the world came into existence, in whom it inheres and to which it returns. The only source for the knowledge of this Brahman is the Sruti or the Upanishads.

The sutras 1.1.5-11 quotes the Samkhya school's view that the Principle of the world is unconscious, and instead asserts that the Principle of the world is conscious and the Brahman itself. The remaining sutras in Pada 1.1, all sutras of 1.2 and 1.3 assert that Brahman is the primary focus of the Upanishads, is various aspects of empirical reality, quoting various verses in support, from Taittiriya Upanishad, Chandogya Upanishad, Kaushitaki Upanishad, Mundaka Upanishad, Katha Upanishad, Brihadaranyaka Upanishad and Prashna Upanishad.

The first chapter in sutras 1.4.1-15 presents the Samkhya theories on Prakriti, and presents its arguments that these are inconsistent and misinterpretation of the Katha, Brihadaranyaka, Shvetashvatara and Taittiriya Upanishad. Sutras 1.4.23 through 1.4.27 state that Brahman is the efficient cause and the material cause of the world. The last sutra of the first chapter states that the arguments on the refutation of Samkhya theories also apply to the atomists (Vaisheshika school of Hindu philosophy).

Chapter 2: Review of competing theories
Second chapter (Avirodha: non-conflict, non-contradiction): discusses and refutes the possible objections to Vedānta philosophy, and states that the central themes of Vedanta are consistent across the various Vedic texts. The Brahma Sūtra states, examines and dismisses the refutations raised by other schools of thoughts, those now classified under Hinduism, Jainism and Buddhism. The second chapter consists of 157 sutras, with thirteen Adhikaranas in the first Pada, eight in second, seventeen Adhikaranas in third, and nine in the fourth Pada.

The second chapter of the Brahma Sūtra has been variously interpreted by various monist, theistic and other sub-schools of Vedanta. The Advaita school for example, states Francis Clooney, asserts that the "identity of Atman and Brahman" based Advaita system is the coherent system while other systems conflict with the Upanishads, or are internally inconsistent, or incoherent with observed reality and cosmos. The theistic sub-schools interpret the text to be stating that Atman is different than Brahman, and thereafter each explains how other systems conflict with the Upanishads or are incoherent.

The Pada 2.1 opens with Adhikarana on Samkhya and Vaisheshika schools argument that Smritis should be a basis for examining the concept of Brahman, and their objections to the Vedanta theory of reflection. The Brahma Sūtras asserts in 2.1.13 through 2.1.20 that the subject and object are one in Brahman, which agrees with Samkhya that there is an identity in cause and effect, adding that the Brahman and the empirical world are therefore one. The sutras 2.1.21 through 2.1.36 present the problem of evil, offering its own doctrine to address it, asserting that Brahman is neither unjust nor cruel, and that inequality and evil exists in the world because of will, choices and circumstances created by actions of living beings over time.

The sutras in Pada 2.1 are variously interpreted by Advaita, Dvaita, Vishishtadvaita and other sub-schools of Vedanta. The monist Advaita school holds that ignorance or Avidya (wrong knowledge) is the root of "problem of evil"; in contrast, dualistic Vedanta schools hold karma and samsara to be the root.

The atomistic physico-theological theories of Vaisheshika and Samkhya school are the focus of the first seventeen sutras of Pada 2.2. The theories of Buddhism are refuted in sutras 2.2.18 through 2.2.32, while the theories of Jainism are analyzed by the text in sutras 2.2.33 through 2.2.36.

The theories of other orthodox traditions are discussed in 2.2.37 through 2.2.45. Ramanuja and Shankara disagree in their formulation as well as critique of then extant orthodox traditions, in their respective commentaries, but both agree that the theory on emergence of Pradyumna (intellect) in the competing orthodox system is the primary flaw.

The first eight case studies in the third Pada of chapter 2 discuss whether the world has an origin or not, whether the universe is co-eternal with Brahman or is an effect of Brahman (interpreted as dualistic God in theistic sub-schools of Vedanta), and whether the universe returns into Brahman periodically. The last nine Adhikaranas of the third Pada discuss the nature of soul, whether it is eternal, is soul an agent, soul's relationship to Brahman, and states its proof that the soul exists and is immortal.

The last Pada of the second chapter extracts and summarizes the theories of human body, sensory organs, action organs and their relationship to Prana (vital breath) in the various Vedic Brahmanas and Upanishads. The Brahma Sūtras states that the organs inside a living being are independent principles, in the seventh and eighth Adhikarana of the fourth Pada. The various sub-schools of Vedanta interpret the sutras in the fourth Pada differently.

Chapter 3: The means to spiritual knowledge

Third chapter (Sādhana: the means): describes the process by which ultimate emancipation can be achieved. The topics discussed are diverse. The third chapter is the longest and consists of 186 sutras, with six Adhikaranas in its first Pada, eight in second, thirty six in third, and fourteen Adhikaranas in the fourth Pada.

The third Brahma Sūtras chapter focuses on the nature of spiritual knowledge and epistemic paths to it. The theory of death and rebirth, karma and importance of conduct and free will, and the connection between Atman (Self, Soul) and the Brahman are discussed in sections 3.1 and 3.2 of the text.

Sections 3.3 and 3.4 describe the need for self-study, reflection of texts read, meditation, etc., as steps while one makes progress and the role of sannyasa (monk, mendicant) in the pursuit of spiritual knowledge.

Meditation
The third pada, states George Thibaut, opens a new section and theme in chapter 3 of the Brahma Sūtras, asserting that meditation is central to the Vedic texts, and summarizing the Vedic theories, from different Shakha (Vedic schools), on "how the individual soul is enabled by meditation on Brahman to obtain final release". These sutras constitute a significant part of the text, extensively refer to the oldest Upanishads, and their commentaries by different Vedanta sub-schools have been extensive, signifying the large historic tradition around meditation, and acceptance of Yoga-sutras teachings in Vedanta.

Meditation is defined in Vedanta texts of commentary on the Sutras, states Klaus Witz, as "a continuous succession of comparable basic conceptions, beliefs, not interspersed with dissimilar ones, which proceeds according to the scriptures and relates to an object enjoined in the scriptures". It is described by Vedantins as a practice of concentrating on an object of meditation, states Witz, a state of "absorption or immersion into essentially a single thought" and "concentrating on it, excluding conventional notions, till one if as completely identified with it as with one's body". While this practice is discussed in Vedic texts, their formulations were differently described by different Vedic schools. The Brahma-sutra, in Adhikaranas of third and fourth pada, states Thibaut, assert that there is no contradiction in these teachings and that "the different Upanishads have to be viewed as teaching the same matter, and therefore the ideas must be combined in one meditation".

The most referred to texts in these sections are the Brihadaranyaka Upanishad, the Chandogya Upanishad, the Kaushitaki Upanishad, the Katha Upanishad, and the non-Upanishadic parts of Shatapatha Brahmana and Aitereya Aranyaka. The topic of meditation, state the Brahma-sutras, is the spiritual knowledge of Brahman; the object of this knowledge, states Thibaut, is "Brahman viewed as the inner Self of all". The Brahma Sutras, in addition to recommending meditation, suggest that rituals and rites are unnecessary because it is knowledge that achieves the purpose.

In sutras 3.4.26 and 3.4.27, the text adds that rituals, however, can spiritually prepare a mind, remove impurities within, empower calmness and distractions from sensory pursuits, and therefore assist in its ability to meditate and gain the ultimate knowledge. The text also discusses, in sutras 3.4.28 to 3.4.31 whether there are restrictions on food (meat) one can ingest, during the spiritual journey. The sutras, translates Thibaut, derive from the Vedic texts that there is "a prohibition of doing harm to any living creature", however, the scriptures state, "only in danger of life, in cases of highest need, food of any kind is permitted to be eaten".

The last three sutras of the chapter 3 assert that a person, pursuing means to spiritual knowledge, should seek a childlike state of innocence, a psychological state that is free of anger, self-centeredness, pride and arrogance. The text declares that according to the Vedic literature knowledge is possible in this life, that one is one's own obstruction in this journey, that liberation and freedom is the fruit of knowledge.

Chapter 4: The benefits of spiritual knowledge
Fourth chapter (Phala: the result): talks of the state that is achieved in final emancipation. This is the shortest chapter with 78 sutras and 38 adhikaranas. The last chapter contains fourteen Adhikaranas in its first Pada, eleven in second, six in third, and seven Adhikaranas in the fourth. The last chapter of the Brahma Sūtras discusses the need and fruits of self-knowledge, the state of freedom and liberation.

The opening sutras of chapter 4 continue the discussion of meditation as means to knowledge, with sutra 4.1.3 summarizing it to be the state where the person accepts, "I am Brahman, not another being" (Adi Shankara), as "Thou indeed I am, O holy divinity, and I indeed thou art, O holy divinity" (Jabalas), and "God is to be contemplated as the Self" and the individual is as the body of God (Ramanuja).

The liberated soul, asserts the Brahma Sūtras, is of the nature of Brahman, with inner power and knowledge, free from evil, free from grief, free from suffering, one of bliss and "for such there is freedom in all worlds".

Commentaries
Numerous commentaries have been written on the Brahma Sūtras text, but many such as that of Bodhayana, Upavarsa, and eighteen out of twenty one mentioned by Narayana in Madhvavijaya-bhava-prakashika are considered lost. Of the surviving commentaries, the earliest extant one is by Adi Shankara.

The diversity of Brahma Sūtras commentaries by various sub-schools of Hinduism (see table) attests to the central importance of the Upanishads, that the text summarizes.

Exegesis
The sutras in the text can be, and have been read in different ways. Some commentators read each line separately, while others sometimes read two as one treating some sutras as contextually connected. Creative readers have read the last word of a sutra as the starting word for the next, some treat a given verse as Purva-paksha (opposing viewpoint) while others read the same verse as Siddhanta (proposed doctrine, or conclusion). For example, states Gregory Darling, Adi Shankara in his commentary on sutra 4.3.14 considers saguna Brahman mentioned therein as Purva-paksha, but acknowledges that some scholars interpret this sutra as a Siddhanta.

Translations
The Brahma Sūtras has been translated into German by Paul Deussen, and in English by George Thibaut. The Thibaut translation is, state De Bary and Embree, "probably the best complete translation in English". Vinayak Sakaram Ghate of Bhandarkar Oriental Research Institute has done a comparative analysis of the Brahma Sutra commentaries of Nimbarka, Ramanuja, Vallabha, Adi Shankara and Madhvacharya in detail and has written the conclusion that Nimbarka's and Ramanuja's balanced commentaries give the closest meaning of the Brahma Sutras taking into account of both kinds of Sutras, those which speak of oneness and those which speak of difference.

Influence
The text is part of the Prasthanatrayi, or the three starting points for the Vedanta school of Hindu philosophy. The Brahma Sūtras constitute the Nyāya prasthāna (न्याय प्रस्थान) or "starting point of reasoning canonical base", while the Principal Upanishads constitute the Sruti prasthāna or "starting point of heard scriptures", and the Bhagavad Gita constitutes the Smriti prasthāna or the "starting point of remembered canonical base".

The nature and influence of Brahma Sūtras, states Paul Deussen, "stands to the Upanishad's in the same relation as the Christian Dogmatics to the New Testament: it investigates their teaching about God, the world, the soul, in its conditions of wandering and of deliverance, removes apparent contradictions of the doctrines, binds them systematically together, and is specially concerned to defend them against the attacks of the opponents".

The Vedas, according to Vedanta, consists of two parts, states Deussen, which show "far reaching analogy with the Old and New Testaments", a Part of Works (karma-kanda) which includes the benedictory mantras, sacrifices and ceremonies like the Old Testament, and a Part of Knowledge (jnana-kanda) which focuses on metaphysical questions about the world, creator, soul, theology, morals and virtues like the New Testament. The respective influence of the two documents, of the New Testament on Christianity, and the Brahma Sūtras on Hinduism has been very significant. This analogy of influence has many common elements but, states Arvind Sharma, there are differences in the role and influence of New Testament in Christianity and the Brahma Sūtras in the Hindu traditions, because in Hinduism texts were never considered as closed, the means and the meaning of soteriology differed, and a diversity of ideas on duality and monism as well as God was accepted.

The impact of Brahma Sūtras text on Vedanta, and in turn Hinduism, has been historic and central, states Nakamura:

Frithjof Schuon states the role of Brahma Sūtras in Hinduism as follows,

See also 
 Prasthanatrayi

Notes

References

External links
Translations and transliteration
 The Vedanta Sutras Part 1, Translated by George Thibaut (English, 1890, Adi Shankara Exegesis, Theistic interpretation)
 The Vedanta Sutras Part 2, Translated by George Thibaut (English, 1890, Adi Shankara Exegesis, Theistic interpretation)
 The Vedanta Sutras Translated by George Thibaut (English, 1890, Ramanuja Exegesis, Theistic interpretation)
Comparative analysis of traditional commentaries on Brahma Sutras. https://archive.org/download/in.ernet.dli.2015.283844/2015.283844.The-Vedanta.pdf
 Brahma Sutra, The Philosophy of Spiritual Life (English) Translated by Sarvepalli Radhakrishnan (English, Multiple scholars includes monist and theistic interpretation), - at archive.org
 Brahma sutra in 10 Indian languages and Roman Transliteration IIT Kanpur

Commentaries

 Sri Bhashya - Brahma Sutra Bhashya by Ramanujacharya (Sanskrit) - at archive.org
 Brahma Sutra Bhashya by Adi Shankaracharya (Sanskrit) - at archive.org
 Brahmasutra Sankara Bhashya, with Ratna-Prabha of Govindananda, Bhamati of Vachaspati Misra and Nyaya-Nirnaya of Anandagari (Sanskrit) - at archive.org
 Brahmasutra Sankara Bhashya, with Bhamati of Vachaspati Misra, Kalpataru of Amalananda and Parimala of Appaya Dikshita (Sanskrit) - at archive.org
 Anubhashya on the Brahma Sutra by Vallabhacharya with Commentaries (4 Volumes Combined) (Sanskrit) - at archive.org
 Brahmasutra Bhasya of Sri Madhvacharya with Glosses (Sanskrit) - at archive.org
 Vedanta-Parijata-Saurabha of Nimbarka and Vedanta-Kaustubha of Srinivasa (English) - at archive.org or Proofread edition including glossary

Vedanta
Sutras (Hinduism)
Sanskrit texts
Ancient Indian literature
Advaita Vedanta texts